The 2015 2014–2016 NORCECA Beach Volleyball Continental Cup were a beach volleyball double-gender event. The winners of the event will qualify for the 2016 Summer Olympics

Men

Round 1

AFECAVOL
Host:  San Juan del Sur, Nicaragua
Dates: February 13–15, 2015

Golden set for third place  15–7

ECVA
Host:  Castaways, Antigua and Barbuda
Dates: April 24–26, 2015

CAZOVA
Host:  Chaguanas, Trinidad and Tobago
Dates: May 8–10, 2015

Women

Round 1

AFECAVOL
Host:  San Juan del Sur, Nicaragua
Dates: February 13–15, 2015

Golden set for third place  15–7

ECVA
Host:  Castaways, Antigua and Barbuda
Dates: April 24–26, 2015

CAZOVA
Host:  Ocho Rios, Jamaica
Dates: May 8–10, 2015

External links
Official website

2014 in beach volleyball
2015 in beach volleyball
2016 in beach volleyball
Continental Beach Volleyball Cup